Josefine Frida Pettersen (born 18 May 1996) is a Norwegian actress. She is best known for the role of Noora in the TV series Skam. Pettersen is from Sigdal.

She made her television debut in the TVNorge series Next Summer, but she has acquired fame for playing the role of Noora Amalie Sætre in Skam, which got her nominated in the 2016 Gullruten Awards in the Publikumsprisen category.

Filmography

Film

Television

Theatre

External links

References 

Living people
1996 births
21st-century Norwegian actresses
Norwegian television actresses
People from Sigdal